Class 02 may refer to:

British Rail Class 02, a class of post-war, British diesel-hydraulic locomotive designed for shunting duties
DRG Class 02, a class of German, standard steam locomotive with a four-cylinder compound configuration
LSWR O2 Class, a class of sixty nineteenth century steam locomotives designed by William Adams for suburban passenger services on the London and South Western Railway

See also
 Class II (disambiguation)
 Class 2 (disambiguation)